A project diary, history, journal or log is a record of a project which is compiled while it is being done.

This record might be used as legal evidence if there is a dispute about the outcome of the project such as a cost overrun.  To facilitate this, entries should be indelible, time-stamped and signed so that they may not be easily altered in retrospect.  The details kept would typically include a record of the time and content of communications such as orders and instructions; events, incidents and their remediation; and the names of the people and parties responsible.

References

 Project management